Richard Weize (Born August 4, 1945 in Bad Gandersheim, Germany)  is the founder of Bear Family Records label, operator of the Richard Weize Archives, and an author. Weize and his work has been featured in the Los Angeles Times, Rolling Stone Die Zeit, Welt, Die Presse, Der Standard, and more.

Education

Weize grew up in Bad Gandersheim. His family has been working in the bookbinding trade since 1845, as well as running a book and stationery shop. His passion for pop music emerged when the first Anglo-American 45-rpm records appeared in Germany in the 1950s, and it was fueled with American Forces Network, Elvis Presley and the Star-Club in Hamburg. By 1960, Weize had become a pioneering record trader, importing hard-to-get country and rock ‘n’ roll albums from the USA and selling them – with a small surcharge – to his friends. Not only was this the start of his own record collection, but also one of the foundation stones of his Bear Family Records business.

Bear Family Records

Weize founded Bear Family Records in 1975.  The label was such a grassroots operation at first that Weize began by typing the label’s first ‟catalogues” on his typewriter, but soon he had to employ some staff to help him with his work. By then Bear Family had changed from a mail order business to a record label selling their own rereleases worldwide. In building the company, Weize had found many companions – producers, authors, musicians, music lovers – some of whom continue to contribute to the label’s releases. Among them: Jürgen Brückner, John Cowley, Hank Davis, Colin Escott, Bill Geerhart, Martin Hawkins, Hugo Keesing, Michael Kleff, Volker Kühn, Rainer E. Lotz, Bernd Matheja, Ted Olson, Tony Russel, Dr. Jürgen Schebera.

Further Activities

Weize retired in 2015, but continues to compile records for Bear Family Records. In addition, he is on the board of the Klaus Kuhnke Archives and continues to release recordings on the “and more bears” label. He, too, has published two books, ‟1000 Nadelstiche (Amerikaner & Briten singen deutsch 1955-1975”—1000 Needlesticks (Americans and British sing in the German language 1955-1975)--and ‟Creole Music of the French West Indies – a discography 1900-1959.” and co-written ‟

‟LONDON Label Lexikon,‟ and contributed a foreword to ‟The TELDEC Story.”

Family

Richard Weize has five children from his first two marriages with Helga and Petra Weize: Ricky (1964), Rene (1965), Tobias (1972), Sarah (1974) and Philipp (1979). Since 1994, Weize has been living with his third wife, Birgit in Vollersode near Bremen.

Awards

Richard Weize has been honored with numerous awards, including the ‟W.C. Handy Award,‟ the ‟Blues Music Award,‟ and several of Bear Family albums have been nominated for Grammys in the U.S. He also received a special award by the Association of German Music Critics in 2003 for his life’s work, and in 2009 the German music industry honored his achievements by granting an Echo award to Bear Family for ‟outstanding contributions to music.‟

On 2 February 2021 Richard Weize was awarded with the Cross of the Order of Merit – on proposal of Germany's Federal President Frank-Walter Steinmeier – for his life’s work. He has devoted his life to the preservation and accessibility of musical cultural assets. Or, as stated by Götz Alsmann in his written eulogy: “Richard Weize’s work is one big recovery of cultural treasures, purely and simply the preservation of the world’s musical heritage.” According to Alsmann, Weize’s work in the field of musical history is by all means comparable to that of Ludwig von Köchel or Otto Erich Deutsch, whose directories are fundamental contributions to the cataloging and preservation of Mozart’s and Schubert’s music.

References

External links

German music people
Living people
1945 births
People from Bad Gandersheim
Recipients of the Cross of the Order of Merit of the Federal Republic of Germany